Stéphane Robert was the defending champion from 2010 as there was no event in 2011 and 2012, but decided not to participate.

Pablo Carreño Busta won the final against Mikhail Kukushkin 6–2, 4–1 ret.

Seeds

Draw

Finals

Top half

Bottom half

References
 Main Draw
 Qualifying Draw

Morocco Tennis Tour - Tangerandnbsp;- Singles
2013 Singles
2013 Morocco Tennis Tour